Jaya Jaitly (born 14 June 1942) is an Indian politician and former President of Samata Party (now led by Uday Mandal its current President), an activist, author and Indian handicrafts curator. She stepped down as party president because of the Operation West End controversy in 2002. In 2020 she was sentenced to 4 years in prison for her role in the Operation West End bribery case.

Biography 
Jaya Jaitly was born on 14 June 1942 in Shimla. Her father was K K Chettur, from Kerala, and was the first Indian ambassador to Japan. Jaitly had been to Japan and Burma. Her father died when she was thirteen. Jaitly and her mother returned to Delhi and joined the Convent of Jesus and Mary school. She met Ashok Jaitly in college and got a scholarship to study in Smith College, US. They got married in 1965. They have two children, Akshay and Aditi (who later married cricketer Ajay Jadeja).

Jaitly met the politician George Fernandes when her husband started working for him. On Fernandes' request, she joined the Socialist Trade Union. After the 1984 Sikh riots, she became active in politics; she calls Fernandes and Madhu Limaye mentors. In the same year, she joined the Janata Party. It split to form the Janta Dal and later, she and Fernandes formed the Samata Party. She and Ashok divorced later and she says her active role in politics was the main reason. For more than 25 years, Fernandes has remained her partner.

After Tehelka's scandal  Operation West End broke out, where she was accused of accepting a bribe of two lakh rupees, Jaitly stepped down as party president a few days later in 2002. In 2012, she was allowed to visit Fernandes, who had Alzheimer's, after she petitioned the High court against Fernandes's relatives who opposed her. In 2020, she was sentenced to 4 years in prison for her role in the Defence Contract bribery case, which in 2001 had embarrassed the NDA-1 government of Atal Bihari Vajpayee and sullied the image of then defence minister George Fernandes leading to his resignation as the Defence Minister. She was convicted under Section 120B (criminal conspiracy) of the IPC and Section 9 (taking gratification for exercise of personal influence with public servant) of the Prevention of Corruption Act, 1988.

Jaya is the promoter and expert in field of India's arts and crafts cottage industries.  Dastkari Haat Samiti (Arts & Crafts Market) was founded by her in year 1986, to enable rural artisans of traditional Indian crafts to gain confidence in the marketplace through many innovative strategies. Her work brings together artisans of India, Pakistan, Vietnam, Africa, Asia and has been taken up by the Indian government as an instrument in diplomacy to bring together crafts practitioners from all over the globe to share their skills and assist in capacity building.

She has authored and published books including Crafts of Jammu, Kashmir and Ladakh, the Craft Traditions of India, Viswakarma's Children, a socio-economic study of crafts people, and Crafting Nature. A selection of her articles on politics, social issues, women, human rights, foreign affairs, etc. was compiled into a book titled Podium on the Pavement. She has assisted NCERT in creating a syllabus for the craft heritage of India's schools. She edits and publishes a monthly political journal of democratic socialist thought and action called The Other Side. She has been deeply involved in heritage issues at all levels and has received awards from PHD Chamber and FICCI for her work in culture and arts and as a role model for women leaders.

See also
Samata Party

References 

Living people
Women in Himachal Pradesh politics
1942 births
Smith College alumni
Samata Party politicians
20th-century Indian women politicians
20th-century Indian politicians
21st-century Indian women politicians
21st-century Indian politicians
Women writers from Himachal Pradesh
Indian art curators
People from Shimla
Janata Dal politicians
Janata Party politicians